The St. Jerome's Laneway Festival, commonly referred to as Laneway, began in Caledonian Lane, Melbourne, Australia, in 2005. Beginning as predominantly an indie music event, the festival grew in popularity and expanded to five Australian cities—Melbourne, Sydney, Brisbane, Adelaide and Fremantle—as well as Auckland, New Zealand and Singapore.

History

2005
St. Jerome's Laneway Festival had its roots in the "St. Jerome's Summer Series" each Sunday afternoon, created by Jerome Borazio and Danny Rogers and featuring new bands of the time, including The Presets and Architecture in Helsinki. They then included a monthly Saturday night called "Brains", which was actually a residency for musical act The Avalanches, and Borazio and Rogers eventually convinced The Avalanches that they could close the lane, remove the bins and stage a laneway party. With the addition of promotional material and other acts, the inaugural St. Jerome's Laneway Festival was launched. The line-up included: The Avalanches, Art of Fighting, Eskimo Joe, The Dears, Cut Copy, Architecture in Helsinki, Clare Bowditch, the Feeding Set and Gersey.

Following a total attendance of 1,400 people at the first Laneway Festival, it was announced later in 2005 that Laneway was expanding to Sydney.

2006

In 2006, both Melbourne and Sydney hosted a line-up of both international and domestic artists, including: Broken Social Scene, Les Savy Fav, Gossip, Pretty Girls Make Graves, The Avalanches, The Posies, The Hold Steady, The Raveonettes and The Drones.

2007
Just as Sydney's Laneway was becoming further established, Brisbane venue The Zoo staged the festival in 2007. A combination of street party and music show included performances from The Walkmen, Yo La Tengo, Peter Bjorn and John, Camera Obscura and Snowman.

2008
In 2008, Laneway found a home at the Fowler's Live venue in Adelaide. Laneway Festival 2008 included performances by Feist, Gotye, Clap Your Hands Say Yeah, The Presets, Stars, The Vasco Era, The Panics and Okkervil River.

2009
Laneway Festival Perth happened for the first time in 2009, which was well-reviewed by FasterLouder.

The 2009 event featured Girl Talk, Stereolab, Architecture In Helsinki, The Hold Steady, The Drones, Cut Off Your Hands, Four Tet, Tame Impala, El Guincho, Jay Reatard, Buraka Som Sistema (DJ/MC set), The Temper Trap and No Age.

An announcement in October 2009 confirmed that the festival would be held in Auckland, New Zealand, from 2010 onwards.

2010
In 2010, Laneway Festival implemented some significant changes to adapt to the growing stature of the event. After some considerable issues with the Melbourne site in 2009, Laneway left its original venue and moved to the inner western suburb of Footscray, with the support of the Footscray Community Arts Centre. The Sydney event relocated from the site at Macquarie Square in the CBD to the courtyards of the Sydney College of the Arts in Rozelle. The inaugural festival in Auckland, New Zealand, sold out.

The line-up in 2010 included: Florence & the Machine, Mumford and Sons, The XX, Kid Sam and Wild Beasts. In November 2010, the organisers announced Singapore as the first city to host the festival in South-east Asia.

2011
For the inaugural Laneway Festival Singapore, music fans from all over Asia travelled to the Canning Park venue.  Paul Kay, co-founder and editor-in-chief of Time Out Hong Kong, wrote of "a lineup that mixed unimpeachable indie credibility with balls-out, dance-till-you-drop rock'n'roll euphoria".

The 2011 list of acts featured: Foals, Warpaint, Beach House, Two Door Cinema Club, Yeasayer, Deerhunter, Ariel Pink's Haunted Graffiti and !!!, among others. Foals frontman Yannis Philippakis called it "the best line-up we've been a part of for a very long time," while the Vine website's Marcus Teague wrote: "the top-to-bottom completeness of this year's Laneway line-up will be hard to beat in future years. Its roster of quality new bands coupled with on-the-cusp outright stars is veritably unmatched by any other festival. There's next to no filler ... It also seems to breed a discerning music fan that's (largely) focussed on the music."

In March, Laneway Festival co-hosted a day party at the American SXSW festival—alongside North American agency The Windish Agency, independent British promoter Eat Your Own Ears, and Austin, Texas publication Austinist—which featured Twin Shadow, Foster the People, Givers, Hanni El Khatib and Jamie Woon, among others. Eat Your Own Ears then invited the Laneway organisers to curate a stage at the August Field Day London event for the first time, which featured Matthew Dear, The Horrors and James Blake.

2012
In 2012, Laneway Festival selected acts such as M83, Chairlift, SBTRKT, Toro y Moi and Washed Out for that year's events. The festival recorded its highest tickets sales ever in Singapore, Auckland and Sydney in 2012. A Vine review stated: "This year's event seemed the most enjoyable yet … the 2012 Laneway proved that it's now an essential recurring destination on the calendar".

Laneway returned to SXSW in 2012—and again in partnership with The Windish Agency, Eat Your Own Ears and Austinist—to co-host the "Austin or Bust" day party that featured DZ Deathrays, Django Django and Chairlift. Laneway's organisers also returned to London's Field Day festival—in collaboration with Last.FM on this occasion—and showcased artists such as Blood Orange, Sleigh Bells, The Vaccines and Kindness.

2013

The Laneway lineup in 2013 included: Bat for Lashes, Japandroids, Divine Fits, Alt-J, Of Monsters and Men, MS MR, Jessie Ware, Flume, Chet Faker, Pond and The Rubens. The Tone Deaf website wrote: "Laneway does not fail to live up to its reputation, putting the mega-corporate festivals to shame with [its] authenticity".

The festival continued to stage its events in New Zealand and Singapore, and programmed a stage at Field Day London for the third time. The Field Day stage featured a line-up of acts that included Charlie Boyer & The Voyeurs, Dark Bells and Django Django.

On 15 March 2013, Laneway Festival announced it will expand to Detroit, US, to make its North American debut on 14 September 2013. The inaugural Laneway Festival Detroit lineup was announced on 13 May 2013, and included co-headliners Sigur Rós and The National. The Detroit event also featured Chvrches, Solange, Savages, AlunaGeorge, Flume and Icona Pop. After spending some time in Detroit in 2012 at the invitation of the Palace Sports & Entertainment company, Rogers said he knew the city was Laneway's next stop and first American venue: "Detroit is having its rebirth and as Laneway continues to evolve, we can identify with a city that is continuing to evolve as well... It seemed like a great fit and this line-up seals it."

On 9 November 2013, Laneway Festival won Music Event of the Year at the West Australian Music Industry Awards.

2014

Laneway Festival sold out five of the seven events in 2014. The festival featured Vance Joy, Lorde, CHVRCHES, Haim, The Jezabels, Earl Sweatshirt, Four Tet, Jamie xx, Frightened Rabbit, Daughter, Warpaint, Danny Brown, Savages and King Krule. Rogers said:We’re exceptionally proud of this year’s line-up. As usual, the artists have been chosen on the strength of their music and their ability to deliver an insanely great live show. It’s why we couldn’t resist bringing a few international acts back and it’s why we are so thrilled to introduce you to some most exciting new artists this side of the world has seen for the very first time. This country has so many incredibly talented artists; if only we could bring them all along.

In 2014, the Perth event relocated from the Perth Cultural Centre to Esplanade Park in the port city of Fremantle. The new venue was chosen due to the event's growth in popularity, accommodating 12,000 people. Laneway also relocated in Adelaide and moved to the historical site of Hart's Mill, Port Adelaide. In regard to the Adelaide move, Rogers explained: "We searched super hard to find a site that we felt could match the experience that other cities have had with Laneway. Renewal SA, the City of Port Adelaide Enfield and a team of locals have worked with us to find a site that ticks all the boxes."

New Zealand artist Lorde was scheduled to perform at Laneway Festival Auckland on 27 January 2014; however, due to her attendance at the Grammy Awards ceremony on 26 January in Los Angeles, US, she was unable to perform. In lieu of her performance at the festival, Laneway's promoters announced a special stand-alone Lorde performance at the festival site at Silo Park, which was held on 29 January 2014.

2015
The festival put women at the front in 2015, with the likes of FKA twigs, St Vincent, Angel Olsen, Banks and the Courtney Barnett playing some of the most coveted time-slots. Other featured musicians were Mac Demarco, Connan Mockasin, Peter Bibby and Pond. Agnes Demarco, mother of Mac, featured as a special guest MC.

2016
2016 saw record ticket sales, and featured Beach House, DIIV, FIDLAR, Violent Soho, Grimes and DMA's, while Melbourne's Tripmonks made a splash with some unexpected nudity. Flume debuted his new material, including special guest appearances from MC Vince Staples and Kai.

2017
Laneway Festival 2017 was the 13th edition of the festival. The festival showcased new international acts such as Car Seat Headrest, NAO, Mick Jenkins, and Aurora, as well as local favourites like D.D Dumbo, Camp Cope, A.B. Original, Tash Sultana  and Tame Impala. 2017 also saw Laneway Festival launch a new podcast, throw a Hottest 100 Backyard Party in Brisbane, and introduce the 1800-LANEWAY hotline in every Australian city.

2018
New collaborations included I OH YOU's Block Party, David Moyle's Royal Moyle food extravaganza, and the debut of Luke Henery's (Violent Soho) latest exhibition, "Everybody Needs A Home". It was the largest line-up so far and featured Mac DeMarco, The Internet and POND, as well as the Australian debut of (Sandy) Alex G, Dream Wife, Shame, S U R V I V E and Slowdive. Triple J live broadcast the Adelaide event, with Ben & Liam mc'ing the event.

2019
The 15th edition took place at a new Sydeney venue, Footscray Park. Acts included Jorja Smith, Clairo, Denzel Curry and Rex Orange County. Gang of Youths closed out the festival in Fremantle.

The festival also teamed up with Girls Rock! to empower the next generation of women and gender-diverse musicians. The inaugural Girls Rock! collaboration featured Alex Lahey, Alex the Astronaut, Courtney Barnett, Georgia Maq (Camp Cope) and Middle Kids, with the line-up varying across each location.

2020
The 16the edition proved to be the most successful festival ever, with record ticket sales, with events held in Auckland, Brisbane, Melbourne, Adelaide, Fremantle and Sydney, where the event was held at The Domain for the very first time. The 1975 and Charli XCX headlined the festival. Other acts included Oliver Tree, BENEE, JID, King Gizzard and the Lizard Wizard, Tones and I and Ruel. Omar Apollo, Oliver Tree and bbno$ all made their Australian debuts.

The sold-out Laneway Festival after-parties, a one-off charity gig by The 1975 and Ruel, and the 50c donation from every beer sold at the festival, collectively raised over $150,000 to support those who were affected by the devastating 2019–20 Australian bushfire season.

2021
The 2021 edition was disrupted by the COVID-19 pandemic in Australia and New Zealand.

2023
The 2023 Auckland portion of the festival was cancelled due to the 2023 North Island floods.

Awards and nominations

Helpmann Awards
The Helpmann Awards is an awards show, celebrating live entertainment and performing arts in Australia, presented by industry group Live Performance Australia since 2001. Note: 2020 and 2021 were cancelled due to the COVID-19 pandemic.
 

! 
|-
| 2006
| St Jerome's Laneway Festival
| Best Contemporary Music Festival
| 
|
|-
| 2007
| St Jerome's Laneway Festival
| Best Contemporary Music Festival
| 
|
|-
| 2008
| St Jerome's Laneway Festival
| Best Contemporary Music Festival
| 
|
|-
| 2016
| St Jerome's Laneway Festival
| Best Contemporary Music Festival
| 
|
|-
| 2017
| St Jerome's Laneway Festival
| Best Contemporary Music Festival
| 
|
|-
| 2018
| St Jerome's Laneway Festival
| Best Contemporary Music Festival
| 
|
|-

National Live Music Awards
The National Live Music Awards (NLMAs) are a broad recognition of Australia's diverse live industry, celebrating the success of the Australian live scene. The awards commenced in 2016.

|-
| rowspan="3" | National Live Music Awards of 2016
| rowspan="3" | St Jerome's Laneway Festival
| Best Live Music Festival or Event
| 
|-
| Victorian Live Event of the Year
| 
|-
| West Australian Live Event of the Year
| 
|-
| rowspan="2" | National Live Music Awards of 2017
| rowspan="2" | St Jerome's Laneway Festival
| Best Live Music Festival or Event
| 
|-
| NSW Live Event of the Year
| 
|-
|  National Live Music Awards of 2019
| St Jerome's Laneway Festival
| Best Live Music Festival or Event
| 
|-
| National Live Music Awards of 2020
| St Jerome's Laneway Festival
| Best Live Music Festival or Event
| 
|-

2005 lineup

The Avalanches
Brains World Music Party
Art of Fighting
Eskimo Joe
The Dears
Cut Copy
Architecture in Helsinki
Ground Components feat. Macromantics
Clare Bowditch and the Feeding Set
Gersey
With a Garden Variety of DJs.

2006 lineup

The Avalanches
Broken Social Scene
Les Savy Fav
Pretty Girls Make Graves
The Hold Steady
The Posies
Faker
New Buffalo
Youth Group
Wolf & Cub
Cut Copy - Melbourne only
Augie March - Melbourne only
The Temper Trap - Melbourne only

Mountains in the Sky - Melbourne only
Dane Tucquet - Melbourne only
The Gossip - Sydney only
The Raveonettes - Sydney only
Decoder Ring - Sydney only
Jens Lekman - Sydney only
Pivot - Sydney only
Mercy Arms - Sydney only
Darren Hanlon - Sydney only
The Pop Frenzy Sound Unit - Sydney only
Clare Bowditch and the Feeding Set - Sydney only
Gersey - Sydney only
Art of Fighting - Sydney only

2007 lineup

Yo La Tengo
Peter Bjorn and John
The Sleepy Jackson
Camera Obscura
Midnight Juggernauts
Love Is All
Fionn Regan
Holly Throsby
Dan Kelly
Gerling
Dappled Cities Fly
The BellRays
The Temper Trap
My Disco
The Crayon Fields

Gersey
The Shaky Hands
Expatriate
Snowman
Bumblebeez 
Archie Bronson Outfit
The Walkmen
Youth Group
Casino Twilight Dogs
Macromantics
Ground Components

2008 lineup 

Feist
Clap Your Hands Say Yeah
Gotye
The Cool Kids
Broken Social Scene Presents Spirit If...
Okkervil River
Dan Deacon†
Via Tania†
The Presets
The Panics

Bridezilla
The Holidays
The Devastations
The Brunettes†
Little Red
Rudely Interrupted
Stars
Violent Soho
Batrider

†: Not playing Adelaide

2009 lineup

Girl Talk
Stereolab
Architecture in Helsinki
The Hold Steady
The Drones
Cut Off Your Hands
Four Tet
Tame Impala
El Guincho
Jay Reatard
Buraka Som Sistema
The Temper Trap
No Age

The John Steel Singers
Canyons
Pivot
Port O'Brien
Holly Throsby
Born Ruffians
Mountains in the Sky
Tim Fite
Still Flyin'
Daedelus
Spiral Stairs
Papa vs Pretty

2010 lineup

Echo & the Bunnymen - No Melbourne / failed to show up in Brisbane.
Midnight Juggernauts - Melbourne only
Florence and the Machine
Black Lips
The xx
Cut Off Your Hands
Bachelorette
Chris Knox and The Nothing
The Naked and Famous
The 3Ds
Daniel Johnston – No Adelaide
Sarah Blasko
Street Chant

N.A.S.A.
Eddy Current Suppression Ring
Hockey
Dappled Cities
Mumford & Sons
The Very Best
Radioclit
Warpaint
Wild Beasts – No Adelaide
Whitley
The Middle East
Kid Sam
Dirty Three

2011 lineup

!!!
The Antlers
Ariel Pink's Haunted Graffiti
Beach House
Bear in Heaven
Blonde Redhead
Cloud Control
Cut Copy
Deerhunter
Foals
Gotye
The Holidays
Holy Fuck

Jenny & Johnny
Warpaint
Les Savy Fav
Local Natives
Yeasayer
Menomena
PVT
Rat Vs Possum (excluding Perth)
Stornoway
Two Door Cinema Club
Violent Soho
World's End Press

2012 lineup

Active Child
Anna Calvi
Austra
Bullion
Chairlift
Cults
The Drums
DZ Deathrays
EMA
Feist
Geoffrey O’Connor
Girls
Givers
Glasser
The Horrors
Husky

John Talabot
Jonti
Laura Marling
M83
Oneman
The Pains of Being Pure at Heart
Pajama Club
The Panics
Portugal. The Man
SBTRKT live
Toro y Moi
Total Control
Twin Shadow
Washed Out
Yuck

2013 lineup

Australia

Alpine
Alt-J
Bat for Lashes
Chet Faker
Cloud Nothings
Divine Fits
El-P
Flume
Henry Wagons & the Unwelcome Company
High Highs
Holy Other
Japandroids
Jessie Ware
Julia Holter
Kings of Convenience
MS MR

Nicolas Jaar
Nite Jewel
Of Monsters and Men
Perfume Genius
Poliça
Pond
Real Estate
Shlohmo
Snakadaktal
The Men
The Neighbourhood
The Rubens
Twerps
Yeasayer

Detroit

ADULT.
AlunaGeorge
Beacon
Chet Faker
CHVRCHES
Deerhunter
The Dismemberment Plan
Flume
Frightened Rabbit
HAERTS
Heathered Pearls
Icona Pop

Matthew Dear
My Brightest Diamond
The National
Phosphorescent
Run the Jewels (El-P & Killer Mike)
Savages
Shigeto
Sigur Rós
Solange
Warpaint
Washed Out
Youth Lagoon

2014 lineup

Australia

Adalita
Autre Ne Veut
Cashmere Cat
Cass McCombs
Chvrches
Cloud Control
Danny Brown
Daughter
Dick Diver
Drenge
Earl Sweatshirt
Four Tet
Frightened Rabbit
HAIM
DJ Jacinda Ardern
Jagwar Ma
Jamie xx
King Krule

Kirin J. Callinan
Kurt Vile
Lorde
Mount Kimbie
MT WARNING
Parquet Courts
Run the Jewels (El-P & Killer Mike)
Savages
Scenic
The Growl
The Jezabels
Unknown Mortal Orchestra
Vance Joy
Warpaint
XXYYXX
Youth Lagoon

Singapore

Chvrches
Daughter
Frightened Rabbit
GEMA
HAIM
Jagwar Ma
James Blake
Jamie xx
The Jezabels

Kurt Vile
Mount Kimbie
Savages
The Observatory
Unknown Mortal Orchestra
Vance Joy
Vandetta
XXYYXX
Youth Lagoon

2015 lineup

Australia

Agnes DeMarco
Andy Bull
Angel Olsen
Banks
Benjamin Booker
Caribou
Connan Mockasin
Courtney Barnett
Dune Rats
Eagulls
Eves
FKA twigs
Flight Facilities
Flying Lotus
Future Islands
Highasakite
Jon Hopkins

Jungle
Little Dragon
Mac DeMarco
Mansionair
Perfect Pussy
Peter Bibby
Pond
Ratking
Raury
Royal Blood
Rustie
Seekae
SOHN
St. Vincent
Tkay Maidza
Vic Mensa

New Zealand

Angel Olsen
Angus & Julia Stone
Ariel Pink
Banks
Belle & Sebastian
Bespin
Connan Mockasin
Courtney Barnett
Dan Deacon
Eagulls
FKA twigs
Flying Lotus
Future Islands
Heavy
Iceage
Jakob

Jon Hopkins
Jungle
Literal Fuck
Little Dragon
Mac DeMarco
Perfect Pussy
Princess Chelsea
Quarks!
Race Banyon
Ratking
Royal Blood
Rustie
SOHN
St. Vincent
Tiny Ruins
Vic Mensa

Singapore

Angus & Julia Stone
Banks
Chet Faker
Courtney Barnett
Eagulls
Enterprise
FKA twigs
Future Islands
.gif
Hanging Up the Moon

Jon Hopkins
Jungle
Little Dragon
Mac DeMarco
Pastel Lite
Pond
Royal Blood
Rustie
St. Vincent

2016 lineup

Australia

Ali Barter
Banoffee
Battles (USA)
Beach House (USA)
Big Scary
Blank Realm
Chvrches (UK)
DIIV (USA)
DMA's
East India Youth (UK)
FIDLAR (USA)
Flume
GoldLink (USA)
Grimes (CAN)
Health (USA)
Hermitude
High Tension

Hudson Mohawke (UK)
Japanese Wallpaper
Jaegan Taylor and his dad
Majical Cloudz (CAN)
Methyl Ethel
METZ (CAN)
Purity Ring (CAN)
QT (USA)
Shamir (USA)
Silicon
Slum Sociable
Sophie (UK)
The Internet (USA)
Royal Headache
The Smith Street Band
Thundercat (USA)
Vince Staples (USA)
Violent Soho

Singapore

Battles
Beach House
Big Scary
Cashew Chemists
Cheats
Chvrches
East India Youth
Fauxe
Flume
GDJYB
Grimes
Hermitude
Hudson Mohawke

Intriguant
JPS
Kane
Kiat
Mean
METZ
Purity Ring
Rah
Riot !n Magenta
Shamir
The 1975
The Internet
Thundercat
Violent Soho

2017 lineup

Australia
Port Adelaide, Brisbane, Fremantle, Melbourne & Sydney

A.B. Original
Aurora (NOR)
Bad Dreems 
Baro 
Bob Moses (CAN)
Camp Cope
Car Seat Headrest (USA)
Clams Casino (USA)
Confidence Man 
D.D Dumbo 
Dream Rimmy 
Dune Rats
Eca Vandal 
Fascinator
Floating Points  (UK)
Flyying Colours 
Gang of Youths
Genesis Owusu 
GL 
Glass Animals (UK)
IV League 
Jagwar Ma
Jess Kent
Julia Jacklin
King Gizzard & the Lizard Wizard
Koi Child
Lonelyspeck 
Luca Brasi
Mick Jenkins (USA)
Mr. Carmack
Nao (UK)
Nicholas Allbrook
Nick Murphy
Roland Tings
Sampa the Great
Tame Impala
Tash Sultana
Tourist (UK)
Tycho (USA)
White Lung (CAN)
Whitney (USA)

New Zealand
Auckland

Aurora
Bob Moses
Car Seat Headrest
Clams Casino
Cut Off Your Hands
DMA's
Fazerdaze
Flight Facilities
Floating Points 
Fortunes
Glass Animals
Julia Jacklin
K2K
King Gizzard & the Lizard Wizard
Mick Jenkins
Mr. Carmack
Nao
Nick Murphy
Nikolai
Purple Pilgrims
Refused
Tame Impala
The Chills
The Veils
Tourist
Tycho
What So Not
White Lung
Whitney
Yukon Era

Singapore

A/K/A Sounds
Astreal
Aurora
Bob Moses
Bottlesmoker
Clams Casino
Floating Points (DJ)
Froya
Gang of Youths
Glass Animals
Jagwar Ma
King Gizzard & the Lizard Wizard
Kohh
Luca Brasi
Mick Jenkins
Mr. Carmack
Nao
Nick Murphy
Poptart
Sampa The Great
Sam Rui
Stars And Rabbit
T-Rex
Tash Sultana
Tourist
Tycho
Wednesday Campanella
White Lung
Whitney

2018 lineup

2019 lineup

2020 lineup

2023 lineup
The Auckland edition of the festival was supposed to be held on 30 January, but cancelled due to rainfall.

References

External links

2007 Pitchfork review

Music festivals in Melbourne
Concert tours
Summer festivals
Music festivals in Singapore
Recurring events established in 2004
Festivals
Festivals in Sydney
Festivals in Brisbane
Festivals in Adelaide